The Poliedro de Caracas ("Caracas Polyhedron Arena") is an indoor sports arena, located on the grounds adjacent to Hipodromo La Rinconada, in Caracas, Venezuela. It was designed by architect Thomas C. Howard of Synergetics, Inc., in Raleigh, NC, in 1971. However, the geodesic dome was not concluded, until 1974, when US firm Charter Industries, along with Synergetics, Inc. designed and manufactured the geodesic dome in Raleigh, NC.

It is housed beneath a geodesic dome, with a capacity of 20,000 people for concerts and 13,500 people for sporting events. The arena is used for concerts, sporting events such as basketball, volleyball, boxing, ice skating shows, and for circuses, and trade expositions, like auto shows, and expomuebles (furniture). Lately, it has also been used for government-sponsored political events.

American Pop-star Michael Jackson was to perform a concert on 12 November 1993 but was cancelled due to his health problems.

Rent rates for Poliedro de Caracas on concerts and some sporting events ranges from $400-$1000 per day

History
Poliedro de Caracas was finished in 1974, and officially inaugurated with the fight between George Foreman and Ken Norton, on March 26, 1974. It also served as the stage for many local acts, like Melissa, Yordano and Ilan Chester, among others, in addition to international acts that visited Venezuela.

One of the main events that took place each year in El Poliedro (up to 2009, 2013 and since 2022), is the Miss Venezuela beauty pageant. The Poliedro was the main venue of the 2013 FIBA AmeriCup, which determined the final four participants of the 2014 FIBA World Cup.

Top concerts 

The following is an incomplete list of the most famous artists who have given concerts in the Poliedro de Caracas:

See also
La Rinconada Hippodrome

References

External links

1974 establishments in Venezuela
Sports venues in Caracas
Sports venues completed in 1974
Geodesic domes
Indoor arenas in Venezuela
Basketball venues in Venezuela
Volleyball venues in Venezuela
Boxing venues in Venezuela
Convention centers in Venezuela